The Rule of the Theotokos is a Christian prayer of the Eastern Orthodox that consists of reciting the Angelical salutation 150 times. This rule is similar to the Rosary of the Western Church.

Some believe that the Mother of God showed the Rule to people in the 8th century AD but was later forgotten, and was rediscovered for Eastern Christians by St Seraphim of Sarov.

The prayer consists of 150 Angelical salutations, which are divided into 15 decades. Each decade focuses on some important event in the life of the Jesus Christ and his virgin-mother. Seraphim Zvezdinsky describes the following structure of the rule:

 Birth of the Theotokos
 Presentation of the Theotokos
 Annunciation
 Visitation to Elisabeth
 Birth of Christ
 Meeting of the Lord
 Flight into Egypt
 Loss of Jesus in the Temple of Jerusalem
 Miracle in Cana of Galilee
 Theotokos standing by the Cross
 Resurrection of Christ
 Ascension of Christ
 Descent of Holy Spirit
 Dormition of the Theotokos
 Glory of the Theotokos

The rule of the Theotokos, as prayed today, in addition to Angelic salutations usually includes also some other prayers. Thus usually some corresponding church hymn (e.g. troparion) is added to each decade. Also some introductory and closing prayers are included.

References

External links 
  The Rule of the Mother of God of St Seraphim of Sarov

Christian prayer
Eastern Orthodox Mariology
Marian devotions